Samam Razi is an Iranian powerlifter. He won the bronze medal in the men's 107 kg event at the 2020 Summer Paralympics held in Tokyo, Japan. A few months later, he also won the bronze medal in his event at the 2021 World Para Powerlifting Championships held in Tbilisi, Georgia.

He won silver with 222 kg at the Powerlifting World Cup in Dubai in February 2016. He also ranked 4th in the men's 97 kg event at the 2016 Summer Paralympics held in Rio de Janeiro, Brazil.

References

External links
 

Iranian powerlifters
Living people
1986 births
Powerlifters at the 2016 Summer Paralympics
Powerlifters at the 2020 Summer Paralympics
Medalists at the 2020 Summer Paralympics
Paralympic medalists in powerlifting
Paralympic bronze medalists for Iran
21st-century Iranian people